Sierra Pacific Airlines is an American charter airline based in Tucson, Arizona, USA. It operates passenger charters and sub-charters for other airlines, as well as for the United States Forest Service, United States Military and the United States Marshals Service with jet aircraft.  Sierra Pacific also previously operated scheduled passenger service in the western U.S. with prop and turboprop aircraft.

History
The airline was initially founded as Trans Sierra Airlines in 1970 by Chris Condon and Allan Silliphant with profits from their box office hit soft X and later R rated 3-D film The Stewardesses. It was renamed Sierra Pacific Airlines when the FAA granted permission to operate aircraft weighing over 12,500 lbs. in 1971. Using Aspen Airways as an aspirational model, the original aircraft were one four-passenger, normally aspirated twin engine Piper Aztec, two eight-passenger turbo-charged twin engine Cessna 402s, followed by the 1973 post ski season introduction of a 44-passenger Convair 440 twin radial engine airliner. The aircraft were operated out of Hollywood Burbank Airport in southern California. Destinations served included Burbank (BUR), Las Vegas (LAS), Los Angeles (LAX), Fresno (FAT), Bishop (BIH), Mammoth Lakes (MMH) and San Jose (SJC). In 1973, Sierra Pacific was purchased by Mammoth Mountain Ski Area. During the winter ski season of 1975-1976, the airline was flying nonstop service from Mammoth Lakes to Los Angeles, Las Vegas and Fresno with direct, one stop service to Burbank with 50 passenger seat Convair 580 turboprops and 19 passenger seat Handley Page Jetstream turboprops.  The Mammoth Mountain Ski Area subsequently sold the airline.

Sierra Pacific also flew de Havilland Canada DHC-6 Twin Otter aircraft as a scheduled intrastate State of California Public Utilities Commission airline while also having interstate CAB exemption to cross state lines.  In February 1976 it became Mountain West Aviation. It is wholly owned by the Sierra Pacific Group.

Until his death in November 2014, the long-time President of Sierra Pacific was Garfield Thorsrud, the founder of Mountain West Aviation. Thorsrud was a smokejumper early in his career and later served in the CIA, including with Intermountain Aviation.

Fleet 
In December 2022, the Sierra Pacific Airlines fleet includes the following aircraft:

 Boeing 737-500

Other aircraft types operated by Sierra Pacific in the past included the Cessna 402 twin prop, Convair 440 propliner, Convair 580 turboprop, de Havilland Canada DHC-6 Twin Otter turboprop and the Handley Page Jetstream (model HP.137) turboprops and Boeing 737-200.

Destinations in 1976 

According to its November 22, 1976, system timetable, Sierra Pacific was operating scheduled passenger service flown with Convair 580 and Handley Page Jetstream turboprop aircraft to the following destinations:

 Bishop, CA (BIH)
 Fresno, CA (FAT)
 Los Angeles (LAX)
 Mammoth Lakes, CA (MMH)
 Reno, NV (RNO)

The airline also served Burbank, CA (BUR) and Las Vegas, NV (LAS) earlier in 1976.

Incidents
On March 13, 1974, a film crew for Wolper Productions filming a Bell Telephone Hour special about Ice Age Neanderthal cavemen filmed at Mammoth Mountain Ski Area, was killed when a Convair 440 plane crashed into the nearby crest of the White Mountains during its climb out from Eastern Sierra Regional Airport in Bishop, California. All 36 on board were killed, including 31 Wolper crew and cast members, although David Wolper was not aboard the aircraft. The filmed segment was recovered in the tail section wreckage and was broadcast as the television documentary Primal Man. , the NTSB has not been able to determine the cause of the crash. There were no indications of technical problems during takeoff, but no plausible explanation of pilot error could be given. It is one of only three uncleared NTSB cases.

References

External links

Sierra Pacific Airlines aircraft

Airlines based in Arizona
Companies based in Tucson, Arizona
Charter airlines of the United States
Airlines established in 1971
American companies established in 1971
1971 establishments in Arizona